7 Persei is a star in the constellation Perseus, located 774 light years away from the Sun. While the star bears the Bayer designation Chi Persei, it is not to be confused with the entire cluster NGC 884, commonly referred to as Chi Persei. It is faintly visible to the naked eye as a dim, yellow-hued star with an apparent visual magnitude of 5.99. This object is moving closer to the Earth with a heliocentric radial velocity of −12.5 km/s.

This is an evolved giant star with a stellar classification of G7 III, most likely (93% chance) on the horizontal branch. At the age of 191 million years, it has 3.84 times the mass of the Sun but has expanded to 24 times the Sun's radius. The star is radiating 316 times the Sun's luminosity from its enlarged photosphere at an effective temperature of 4,974 K.

References

G-type giants
Horizontal-branch stars
Perseus (constellation)
Persei, Chi
Durchmusterung objects
Persei, 07
013994
010729
0662